Still in the Game is the sixth studio album by American singer Keith Sweat. It was released by Elektra Records on September 22, 1998 in the United States. The title of the album refers to Sweat being in the music business for over a decade. It was certified Platinum by the Recording Industry Association of America (RIAA) on October 14, 1998. The single "Come and Get with Me" peaked at number 12 in the US. Follow-up "I'm Not Ready", released a year later, peaked at number 16.

Critical reception

Allmusic editor Michael Gallucci wrote that "Sweat is still capable of making decent records a decade into his career. He knows the secret of a good slow-groove album: seduction on the most intimate of levels. And on Still in the Game, Sweat goes one-on-one with his audience, playing into their hearts and souls with his typically smooth-croon grandeur. It all sounds a bit familiar (as well as a bit programmed) – and the Jermaine Dupri, Erick Sermon and Too Short cameos add absolutely nothing to Sweat's sweet mix – but there's a cool sexuality in his grooves and moves."

Track listing

Personnel

 Keith Sweat – background vocals, producer, executive producer
 Darryl Adams – drums, keyboards, background vocals, producer
 Big Baby & Suga Mike – producer, keyboards, programming
 Jermaine Dupri – vocals
 Free – vocals
 Curtis Jefferson – backing vocals
 Allen "Grip" Smith – keyboards
 Bobby Crawford – sequencing, programming
 Eugene Peoples – additional Keyboards, acoustic guitar
 Jay Mack – keyboards, sequencing, programming
 Erick Sermon – vocals

 Snoop Dogg – vocals
 Taj Mahal – engineer
 Too Short – vocals
 Nicarlo Williams – background vocals
 Val Young – background vocals
 Joe N Little III – writer, producer and background vocals
 Karl Heilbron – bBass, recording engineer, mixing
 Steve Crooms, Ivan Walker – recording engineer
 Neal H. Pogue – mixing
 Kevin "KD" Davis – mixing
 Herb Powers – mastering

Charts

Weekly charts

Year-end charts

Certifications

References

1998 albums
Keith Sweat albums
Elektra Records albums
Albums produced by Jermaine Dupri